Willie Thomas Phelps (September 5, 1914 in Chesapeake City – March 1, 2004) was an American songwriter and country and western guitarist. He performed with his brothers Norman and Earl as the Phelps Brothers. His songs were recorded by country artists such as Jim Reeves, and once by Elvis Presley. Phelps' songs featured in cowboy films in the 1930s; the three brothers had a screen appearance as Ray Whitley's cowboy band in Hittin' the Trail 1937, and Phelps' "Move Slow, Little Dogie" featured in the film The Renegade Ranger 1938.

In 1961 he saluted Jimmie Rodgers (died 1933) and Hank Williams (died 1953) on an EP Willie Phelps Salutes Rodgers And Williams, with the songs A1: "Hank Williams Meets Jimmie Rodgers", A2: "There's A New Star In Hillbilly Heaven", B1: "Hank Williams Will Live Forever", B2: "So Long Pal Jimmie"

Selected songs
"The Merry Christmas Polka" Jim Reeves Twelve Songs of Christmas 1963 
"When Jesus Calls"   Stand by Me (Ernest Tubb album) 1966
"I'm Beginning to Forget You" 1959 Elvis: A Legendary Performer Volume 4

Discography
Phelps Brothers
A: Were You Really Livin' / B: Playin' House
Willie Phelps
 A: I'm Beginning To Forget You B: Do Anything But Leave Me 1957
 A: I Got A Feelin' B: Silver Box 1957
A: Someone's Gonna Get Hurt Now B: All Too Soon They Grow Up 1966

References

1914 births
2004 deaths
American male songwriters
20th-century American musicians
20th-century American male musicians